Mohamed Dellahi Yali (born 1 November 1997) is a Mauritanian international footballer  who plays for Al-Nasr.

International career
Yali scored his second international goal in qualification for the 2018 African Nations Championship; the first of a 2–0 win over Liberia.

Career statistics

Club

Notes

International

International goals
Scores and results list Mauritania's goal tally first.

References

External links

1997 births
Living people
Mauritanian footballers
Mauritanian expatriate footballers
Mauritania international footballers
FC Tevragh-Zeina players
FC Nouadhibou players
FK Liepāja players
DRB Tadjenanet players
NA Hussein Dey players
Latvian Higher League players
Algerian Ligue Professionnelle 1 players
Association football midfielders
People from Nouakchott
Mauritanian expatriate sportspeople in Latvia
Expatriate footballers in Latvia
Mauritanian expatriate sportspeople in Algeria
Expatriate footballers in Algeria
Mauritanian expatriate sportspeople in Libya
Expatriate footballers in Libya
2019 Africa Cup of Nations players
2021 Africa Cup of Nations players
ASC Tidjikja players
Al-Nasr SC (Benghazi) players
Mauritania A' international footballers
2018 African Nations Championship players
2022 African Nations Championship players